Rolf Gramstad (born 5 January 1957) is a Norwegian former motorcycle speedway rider who rode in the British League for Swindon Robins and Leicester Lions.

Biography
Gramstad was born in Sandnes, Norway in 1957. He rode for Vienna in 1977, gaining his first cap for Norway later that year and first raced in Britain with Swindon Robins in 1978, and after two season moved to Leicester Lions, where from a starting point of reserve he became a heat leader by the end of his first season, averaging over 7.4. In 1981, he won the Nordic Long Track Championship.

His career was ended on 6 September 1981 by a freak accident while competing in grasstrack at Berghaupten, in West Germany, which left him paralysed. Czech rider Zdenek Kudrna, making a practice start, smashed violently into the rear of Gramstad, who had stopped on the inside of the back straight after completing a practice race. Gramstad was preparing for a practice start before returning to the pits. Having damaged three vertebrae in the collision with Kudrna, Gramstad was taken for surgery to a hospital at Strasbourg, France. He later received further treatment at a hospital in Sheffield, England. By the end of the year Gramstad was able to walk with crutches, and within two years of the accident walked unaided down the aisle at his wedding. But he was unable to race again.

References

1957 births
Living people
People from Sandnes
Norwegian speedway riders
Swindon Robins riders
Leicester Lions riders
Sportspeople from Rogaland